Great Britain, represented by the British Olympic Association (BOA), competed at the 1984 Summer Olympics in Los Angeles, United States. British athletes have competed in every Summer Olympic Games. 337 competitors, 229 men and 108 women, took part in 190 events in 20 sports.

The British team won a total of 37 medals, including five golds, this was Britain's largest total medal haul since 1920, and would not be surpassed until 2008, however this was due in large part to the Soviet-led boycott of the 1984 Olympics, which meant that Eastern Bloc competitors were not present. Great Britain sent a reserve team to the Soviet organised Friendship Games, dubbed the "alternative Olympics" the same year.


Medallists

Archery

In the fourth appearance by Great Britain in modern Olympic archery, three men and three women represented the country. The women's scores were separated by only 10 points, as the three placed consecutively in the final ranking.

Women's Individual Competition:
Eileen Robinson - 2408 points (→ 29th place)
Angela Goodall - 2401 points (→ 30th place)
Susan Wilcox - 2398 points (→ 31st place)

Men's Individual Competition:
Steven Hallard - 2473 points (→ 21st place)
Peter Gillam - 2435 points (→ 30th place)
Richard Priestman - 2339 points (→ 48th place)

Athletics

Men's Competition
Men's 100 metres
 Mike McFarlane
 Final — 10.27 (→ 5th place)

 Donovan Reid
 Final — 10.32 (→ 7th place)

Men's 200 metres
Ade Mafe
 Heat — 21.02
 Quarterfinals — 20.55
 Semifinals — 20.54
 Final — 20.98 (→ 8th place)

Men's 400 metres 
Kriss Akabusi
 Heat — 45.64
 Quarterfinals — 45.43
 Semifinals — 45.69 (→ did not advance)

Philip Brown
 Heat — 46.26
 Quarterfinals — 46.63 (→ did not advance)

Todd Bennett
 Heat — 46.09
 Quarterfinals — 45.51 (→ did not advance)

Men's 5,000 metres 
 Tim Hutchings
 Heat — 13:46.01
 Semifinals — 13:28.60
 Final — 13:11.50 (→ 4th place)

 Eamonn Martin
 Heat — 13:46.16
 Semifinals — 13:41.70
 Final — 13:53.34 (→ 13th place)

 David Moorcroft
 Heat — 13:51.40
 Semifinals — 13:28.44
 Final — 14:16.61 (→ 14th place)

Men's 10,000 metres
 Mike McLeod
 Qualifying Heat — 28:24.92
 Final — 28:06.22 (→  Silver Medal)

 Steve Jones
 Qualifying Heat — 28:15.22
 Final — 28:28.08 (→ 8th place)

 Nick Rose
 Qualifying Heat — 28:31.13
 Final — 28:31.73 (→ 12th place)

Men's Marathon
 Charlie Spedding
 Final — 2:09:58 (→  Bronze Medal)

 Hugh Jones
 Final — 2:13:57 (→ 12th place)

 Geoff Smith
 Final — did not finish (→ no ranking)

Men's High Jump
 Geoff Parsons
 Qualification — 2.21 m (→ did not advance)

 Mark Naylor
 Qualification — no mark (→ did not advance)

Men's triple jump
 Keith Connor
 Final — 16.87 m (→  Bronze Medal)

 Eric McCalla
 Final — 16.66 m (→ 8th place)

Men's Javelin Throw 
 David Ottley
 Qualification — 85.68 m
 Final — 85.74 m (→  Silver Medal)

 Roald Bradstock
 Qualification — 83.06 m
 Final — 81.22 m (→ 7th place)

Men's Hammer Throw 
 Robert Weir
 Qualification — 73.04 m
 Final — 72.62 m (→ 8th place)

 Martin Girvan
 Qualification — 72.66 m
 Final — 72.32 m (→ 9th place)

 Matthew Mileham
 Qualification — 71.80 m
 Final — no mark (→ no ranking)

Men's Pole Vault
 Jeff Gutteridge
 Qualifying Round — 5.30 m
 Final — 5.10 m (→ 11th place)

 Keith Stock
 Qualifying Round — 5.20 m (→ did not advance)

Men's Decathlon 
 Daley Thompson
 Final Result — 8797 points (→  Gold Medal)

 Brad McStravick
 Final Result — 7890 points (→ 11th place)

 Colin Boreham
 Final Result — 7485 points (→ 20th place)

Men's 20 km Walk
 Philip Vesty
 Final — 1:27:28 (→ 13th place)

 Ian McCombie
 Final — 1:28:53 (→ 19th place)

 Steve Barry
 Final — 1:30:46 (→ 24th place)

Men's 50 km Walk
 Chris Maddocks
 Final — 4:26:33 (→ 16th place)

Women's Competition
Women's 1,500 metres 
 Christine Benning
 Heat — 4:10.48
 Final — 4:04.70 (→ 5th place)

 Christina Boxer
 Heat — 4:07.40
 Final — 4:05.53 (→ 6th place)

 Lynne MacDougall
 Heat — 4:09.08
 Final — 4:10.58 (→ 11th place)

Women's 3,000 metres 
 Wendy Sly
 Heat — 8:58.66
 Final — 8:39.47 (→  Silver Medal)

 Zola Budd
 Heat — 8:44.62
 Final — 8:48.80 (→ 7th place)

 Jane Furniss
 Heat — 8:44.62 (→ did not advance)

Women's Marathon 
 Priscilla Welch
 Final — 2:28:54 (→ 6th place)

 Joyce Smith
 Final — 2:32:48 (→ 11th place)

 Sarah Rowell
 Final — 2:34:08 (→ 14th place)

Women's 400 m Hurdles 
 Susan Morley
 Heat — 58.71
 Semifinal — 56.67 (→ did not advance)

 Gladys Taylor
 Heat — 57.64
 Semifinal — 56.72 (→ did not advance)

Women's High Jump 
 Diana Elliott
 Qualification — 1.90 m
 Final — 1.88 m (→ 9th place)

 Judy Simpson
 Qualification — 1.84 m (→ did not advance, 19th place)

Women's Long Jump
Sue Hearnshaw
 Qualification — 6.64 m
 Final — 6.80 m (→  Bronze Medal)

Women's Discus Throw 
 Meg Ritchie
 Qualification — 56.00 m
 Final — 62.58 m (→ 5th place)

 Venissa Head
 Qualification — 55.24 m
 Final — 58.18 m (→ 7th place)

Women's Shot Put
 Judy Oakes
 Final — 18.14 m (→ 4th place)

 Venissa Head
 Final — 17.90 m (→ 6th place)

Women's Javelin Throw 
 Tessa Sanderson
 Qualification — 61.58 m
 Final — 69.56 m (→  Gold Medal)

 Fatima Whitbread
 Qualification — 65.30 m
 Final — 67.14 m (→  Bronze Medal)

 Sharon Gibson
 Qualification — 60.88 m
 Final — 59.66 m (→ 9th place)

Women's Heptathlon
 Judy Simpson
 Final Result — 6280 points (→ 5th place)

 Kim Hagger
 Final Result — 6127 points (→ 8th place)

Boxing

Men's Light Flyweight (– 48 kg)
 John Lyon
 First Round — Defeated Alego Akomi (SUD), 5:0
 Second Round — Defeated Yehuda Ben Haim (ISR), 5:0
 Quarterfinals — Lost to Paul Gonzales (USA), 1:4

Men's Bantamweight (– 54 kg)
 John Hyland
 First Round — Bye
 Second Round — Lost to Moon Sung-Kil (South Korea), retired in third round

Men's Heavyweight (– 91 kg)
 Douglas Young
 First Round – Bye
 Second Round – Lost to Georgios Stefanopoulos (GRE), KO-2

Men's Super Heavyweight (+ 91 kg)
 Robert Wells → Bronze Medal
 First Round – Bye
 Quarterfinals – Defeated Viliami Pulu (TNG), KO-1
 Semifinals – Lost to Francesco Damiani (ITA), RSC-3

Canoeing

Cycling

Sixteen cyclists represented Great Britain in 1984.

Men's individual road race
 Mark Bell — did not finish (→ no ranking)
 Neil Martin — did not finish (→ no ranking)
 Peter Sanders — did not finish (→ no ranking)
 Darryl Webster — did not finish (→ no ranking)

Team time trial
 Steven Poulter
 Keith Reynolds
 Peter Sanders
 Darryl Webster

Sprint
 Mark Barry

1000m time trial
 Mark Barry

Individual pursuit
 Shaun Wallace
 Steve Bent

Team pursuit
 Steve Bent
 Paul Curran
 Mark Noble
 Adrian Timmis

Points race
 Shaun Wallace
 Paul Curran

Women's individual road race
 Catherine Swinnerton — 2:13:28 (→ 13th place)
 Linda Gornall — 2:13:28 (→ 17th place)
 Maria Blower — 2:22:03 (→ 29th place)
 Muriel Sharp — 2:22:03 (→ 30th place)

Diving

Men's 3m Springboard
Christopher Snode
 Preliminary Round — 592.68
 Final — 609.51 (→ 5th place)

Nigel Stanton
 Preliminary Round — 521.61 (→ did not advance, 15th place)

Equestrian

Fencing

20 fencers, 15 men and 5 women, represented Great Britain in 1984.

Men's foil
 Bill Gosbee
 Pierre Harper
 Nick Bell

Men's team foil
 Bill Gosbee, Pierre Harper, Nick Bell, Rob Bruniges, Graham Paul

Men's épée
 Steven Paul
 John Llewellyn
 Jonathan Stanbury

Men's team épée
 Ralph Johnson, John Llewellyn, Neal Mallett, Steven Paul, Jonathan Stanbury

Men's sabre
 Mark Slade
 Richard Cohen
 John Zarno

Men's team sabre
 Richard Cohen, Paul Klenerman, Jim Philbin, Mark Slade, John Zarno

Women's foil
 Linda Ann Martin
 Liz Thurley
 Fiona McIntosh

Women's team foil
 Ann Brannon, Linda Ann Martin, Fiona McIntosh, Liz Thurley, Katie Arup

Gymnastics

Hockey

Men's team competition
Preliminary round (group B)
 Great Britain – Kenya 2-1
 Great Britain – Canada 3-1
 Great Britain – New Zealand 1-0
 Great Britain – Netherlands 4-3
 Great Britain – Pakistan 0-0
Semi Finals
 Great Britain – West Germany 0-1
Bronze Medal Game
 Great Britain – Australia 3-2 (→  Bronze Medal)

Team roster
 (1.) Ian Taylor (gk)
 (2.) Veryan Pappin (gk)
 (3.) Stephen Martin
 (4.) Paul Barber
 (5.) Robert Cattrall
 (6.) Jon Potter
 (7.) Richard Dodds
 (8.) Billy McConnell
 (9.) Norman Hughes
 (10.) David Westcott (c)
 (11.) Richard Leman
 (12.) Stephen Batchelor
 (13.) Sean Kerly
 (14.) James Duthie
 (15.) Kulbir Bhaura
 (16.) Mark Precious
Head coach: David Whitaker

Judo

Modern pentathlon

Three male pentathletes represented Great Britain in 1984.

Individual
 Richard Phelps
 Michael Mumford
 Stephen Sowerby

Team
 Richard Phelps
 Michael Mumford
 Stephen Sowerby

Rhythmic gymnastics

Rowing

Men's coxless pair  
 John Beattie, Richard Stanhope
 (→ 12th place)

Men's coxed pair
 Adrian Genziani, Bill Lang, Alan Inns
 (→ 8th place)

Men's coxless four 
Jonathan Clift, John Garrett, Martin Knight, John Bland
 (→ 9th place)

Men's coxed four 
Richard Budgett, Martin Cross, Andy Holmes,  Steve Redgrave, Adrian Ellison
 (→ Gold)Men's eight 
 Clive Roberts, Adam Clift, Salih Hassan, Chris Mahoney, Duncan McDougall, Malcolm McGowan, John Pritchard, Allan Whitwell, Colin Moynihan
 (→ 5th place)Women's single scull Beryl Mitchell
 (→ 6th place)Women's double scull  
 Sally Bloomfield, Nonie Ray
 (→ 8th place)Women's coxless pair  
 Kate Panter, Ruth Howe
 (→ 6th place)Women's coxed four Tessa Millar, Jean Genchi, Joanna Toch, Katie Ball, Kathy Talbot
 (→ 7th place)Women's eight 
 Astrid Ayling, Ann Callaway, Alexa Forbes, Gillian Hodges, Kate Holroyd, Belinda Holmes, Sarah Hunter-Jones, Kate McNicol, Sue Bailey 
 (→ 5th place)

Sailing

Shooting

Swimming

Men's CompetitionMen's 100 m Freestyle 
David Lowe
 Heat — 51.68
 B-Final — 51.48 (→ 11th place)

Paul Easter
 Heat — 51.83 (→ did not advance, 21st place)Men's 200 m FreestylePaul Easter
 Heat — 1:51.80
 B-Final — 1:51.70 (→ 9th place)

Andrew Astbury
 Heat — 1:52.01
 B-Final — 1:53.02 (→ 15th place)Men's 400 m Freestyle 
Andrew Astbury
 Heat — 3:58.41
 B-Final — 3:58.14 (→ 14th place)

Paul Howe
 Heat — 4:04.07 (→ did not advance, 25th place)Men's 1500 m Freestyle 
David Stacey
 Heat — 15:30.10 (→ did not advance, 12th place)

Stuart Willmott
 Heat — 15:57.79 (→ did not advance, 21st place)Men's 100 m Backstroke 
Neil Harper
 Heat — 58.50 (→ did not advance, 17th place)

Ian Collins
 Heat — 1:00.08 (→ did not advance, 28th place)Men's 200 m Backstroke 
Neil Cochran
 Heat — 2:05.58
 B-Final — 2:05.72 (→ 14th place)

Neil Harper
 Heat — 2:09.48 (→ did not advance, 24th place)Men's 100 m BreaststrokeAdrian Moorhouse
 Heat — 1:04.06
 Final — 1:03.25 (→ 4th place)

Iain Cambell
 Heat — 1:04.81
 B-Final — 1:05.02 (→ 14th place)Men's 200 m BreaststrokeAdrian Moorhouse
 Heat — 2:19.83
 B-Final — 2:18.83 (→ 9th place)

Iain Cambell
 Heat — 2:20.78
 B-Final — 2:20.62 (→ 11th place)Men's 100 m ButterflyAndrew Jameson
 Heat — 54.49
 Final — 54.28 (→ 5th place)

Ian Collins
 Heat — 56.41 (→ did not advance, 22nd place)Men's 200 m ButterflyNick Hodgson
 Heat — 2:01.64
 B-Final — 2:01.24 (→ 11th place)

Philip Hubble
 Heat — 2:02.76
 B-Final — 2:03.06 (→ 16th place)Men's 200 m Individual MedleyNeil Cochran
 Heat — 2:05.39
 Final — 2:04.38 (→  Bronze Medal)

Robin Brew
 Heat — 2:04.13
 Final — 2:04.52 (→ 4th place)Men's 400 m Individual MedleyStephen Poulter
 Heat — 4:25.38
 Final — 4:25.80 (→ 7th place)

Stuart Willmott
 Heat — 4:32.90
 B-Final — 4:31.10 (→ 15th place)Men's 4 × 100 m Freestyle Relay 
David Lowe, Roland Lee, Paul Easter, and Richard Burrell
 Heat — 3:24.59
 Final — 3:23.61 (→ 5th place)Men's 4 × 200 m Freestyle Relay 
Neil Cochran, Paul Easter, Paul Howe, and Andrew Astbury
 Heat — 7:26.83
 Final — 7:24.78 (→  Bronze Medal)Men's 4 × 100 m Medley Relay 
Neil Harper, Adrian Moorhouse, Andy Jameson, and David Lowe
 Heat — 3:49.86
Neil Harper, Adrian Moorhouse, Andy Jameson, and Richard Burrell
 Final — 3:47.39 (→ 6th place)

Women's CompetitionWomen's 100 m Freestyle 
June Croft
 Heat — 57.12
 Final — 57.11 (→ 7th place)

Nicola Fibbens
 Heat — 57.80
 B-Final — 57.36 (→ 11th place)Women's 200 m Freestyle 
June Croft
 Heat — 2:01.05
 Final — 2:00.64 (→ 6th place)

Annabelle Cripps
 Heat — 2:04.44
 B-Final — 2:04.90 (→ 15th place)Women's 400 m Freestyle 
Sarah Hardcastle
 Heat — 4:11.55
 Final — 4:10.27 (→  Silver Medal)

June Croft
 Heat — 4:15.51
 Final — 4:11.49 (→  Bronze Medal)Women's 800 m Freestyle 
Sarah Hardcastle
 Heat — 8:35.87
 Final — 8:32.60 (→  Bronze Medal)

Annabelle Cripps
 Heat — 8:58.09 (→ did not advance, 14th place)Women's 100 m BackstrokeBeverley Rose
 Heat — 1:03.61
 Final — 1:04.16 (→ 7th place)

Catherine White
 Heat — 1:05.03
 B-Final — 1:04.99 (→ 13th place)Women's 200 m BackstrokeCatherine White
 Heat — 2:18.02
 B-Final — 2:17.63 (→ 10th place)

Katherine Read
 Heat — 2:18.92
 B-Final — 2:18.33 (→ 11th place)Women's 200 m ButterflySamantha Purvis
 Heat — 2:11.97
 Final — 2.12.33 (→ 5th place)

Ann Osgerby
 Heat — 2:16.31
 B-Final — 2:19.10 (→ 16th place)Women's 200 m Individual MedleyGaynor Stanley
 Heat — 2:24.94
 B-Final — 2:21.71 (→ 13th place)

Zara Long
 Heat — 2:23.89
 B-Final — 2:22.25 (→ 14th place)Women's 400 m Individual MedleyGaynor Stanley
 Heat — 4:53.70
 Final — 4:52.83 (→ 7th place)

Sarah Hardcastle
 Heat — 4:55.78
 B-Final — 4:51.55 (→ 9th place)Women's 4 × 100 m Freestyle Relay 
Annabelle Cripps, Nicola Fibbens, Debra Gore, and June Croft
 Heat — 3:51.47
 Final — 3:50.12 (→ 6th place)Women's 4 × 100 m Medley Relay'''
Beverley Rose, Jean Hill, Nicola Fibbens, and June Croft
 Heat — 4:16.83
 Final — 4:14.05 (→ 4th place)

Synchronized swimming

Weightlifting

Wrestling

References

Nations at the 1984 Summer Olympics
1984
Summer Olympics